Paul Byrne (born 29 January 1976) is an Australian male former track and field athletes. He was born in Geelong, Victoria and grew up in Connewarre and Grovedale, Victoria. He was an outstanding junior athlete who won a gold medal at the 1994 World Junior Championships in Athletics, held in Lisbon. Injuries hampered much of his career. His best result in his senior career was a semi-final appearance at the 1996 Atlanta Olympics.

Personal bests
800 metres – 1:45.91 – Lindau – 28 July 1995
1000 metres – 2:20.5 – Melbourne – 6 January 1995

References 

1976 births
Living people
Sportspeople from Geelong
Australian male middle-distance runners
Olympic male middle-distance runners
Olympic athletes of Australia
Athletes (track and field) at the 1996 Summer Olympics
20th-century Australian people